The fantastic least gecko, or fantastic sphaero (Sphaerodactylus fantasticus) is a species of gecko found in the Caribbean, on the islands of Dominica, Montserrat, and the Guadeloupe archipelago.

Morphology 
A medium-size gecko of the genus Sphaerodactylus. Dorsal scales are keeled in texture, acute to cycloid in shape, and slightly imbricate. Color pattern is sexually dichromatic, and varies greatly between subspecies. 

Dorsal ground color of both sexes is brown to ochre. The head color is light brown which may be with or without markings, which may include dark stripes broken into small brown spots, or spots that fuse to produce dark head with light stripes for spots. There is no dark scapular patch or ocelli in both sexes, a characteristic that frequently seen in other species. The dorsal coloration is (salt and pepper) mottled with light and dark scales, either of which may dominate. The tail may contain dark edged light ocelli (usually paired) irregularly arranged along dorsal surface. Throat grayish and distinctly lineate, with lines extending posteriorly from the tip of the snot. Venter is uniformly white or with dark spackling.

Subspecies 
Nine subspecies have been described, each of which has a very restricted range and varies in coloration and other physical characteristics.
Sphaerodactylus fantasticus fantasticus A.M.C. Duméril & Bibron, 1836
Sphaerodactylus fantasticus anidrotus Thomas, 1965
Sphaerodactylus fantasticus fuga Thomas, 1965
Sphaerodactylus fantasticus hippomanes Thomas, 1965
Sphaerodactylus fantasticus karukera Thomas, 1965
Sphaerodactylus fantasticus ligniservulus King, 1962
Sphaerodactylus fantasticus orescius Thomas, 1965
Sphaerodactylus fantasticus phyzacinus Thomas, 1965
Sphaerodactylus fantasticus tartaropylorus Thomas, 1965

Distribution 
Endemic to the Lesser Antilles. Native to Guadeloupe (including some of its satellites like Marie Galante and La Desirade), Montserrat, and the western coast of Dominica.

Biogeography 
On Dominica, the distribution of the subspecies S. fantasticus fuga is limited to the western coast (Malhotra and Thorpe 1999). These dwarf geckos have recently been found to be genetically similar to one population on Guadeloupe, suggesting that they are recent colonizers of Dominica (Malhotra and Thorpe 1999; Thorpe et al. 2008).

Ecology 
This is a terrestrial species that occurs in a moderately wide range of habitats which are usually near the coast. These include mesic and xeric forests, beaches, hillsides and houses. During the day, it can be found (active) on piles of organic debris and leaf litter (in shaded situations). Also hiding under stones, logs, and piles of debris.

Habitat

References

External links

Sphaerodactylus fantasticus at the Encyclopedia of Life
Sphaerodactylus fantasticus at the Reptile Database

Sphaerodactylus
Lizards of the Caribbean
Reptiles of Dominica
Reptiles of Guadeloupe
Reptiles of Montserrat
Reptiles described in 1836
Taxa named by Gabriel Bibron
Taxa named by André Marie Constant Duméril